C. Bernard Harris (born November 26, 1950 in Roanoke, Virginia) was a professional basketball power forward who played one season in the National Basketball Association (NBA) as a member of the Buffalo Braves during the 1974–75 season. He was drafted from Virginia Commonwealth University by the Braves during the fourth round of the 1974 NBA Draft by the Braves. Harris later played in the Philippines as an import for the Crispa Redmanizers. From 1980 onwards, he played in SM-sarja in Finland, and he later received Finnish citizenship.

References

External links

1950 births
Living people
American expatriate basketball people in the Philippines
American men's basketball players
Basketball players from Virginia
Buffalo Braves draft picks
Buffalo Braves players
Crispa Redmanizers players
Philippine Basketball Association imports
Power forwards (basketball)
Sportspeople from Roanoke, Virginia
VCU Rams men's basketball players
American expatriate basketball people in Finland
Finnish people of African-American descent
Finnish people of American descent
Naturalized citizens of Finland